Sharqliyya (also spelled Sharqlieh) is a village in central Syria, administratively part of the Homs Governorate, located northwest of Homs. Nearby localities include al-Qabu and al-Shinyah to the west, al-Taybah al-Gharbiyah to the northwest, Taldou to the northeast and Ghur Gharbiyah to the east.

According to the Central Bureau of Statistics (CBS), Sharqliyya had a population of 1,362 in the 2004 census. Its current inhabitants are predominantly Alawites and agriculture is the chief source of income for the village.

History
During the late Ottoman era, in 1829, Sharqliyya was a Turkmen village in the Sanjak of Hama, consisting of 12 feddans. In 1838 Sharqliyya's inhabitants were reported to be Muslims by British scholar Eli Smith.

References

Bibliography

 

Populated places in Homs District
Alawite communities in Syria